Khiry Lamar Shelton (born June 26, 1993) is an American professional soccer player who plays for Major League Soccer club Sporting Kansas City. He has also represented the United States at the under-18 and under-23 levels.

Club career

College and amateur
Shelton was born in Fort Carson, Colorado and raised in Leander, Texas. He attended high school at Vista Ridge in Cedar Park, Texas, becoming a four-year letterman for their soccer team, while in 2010 he was selected as Offensive MVP and was a first-team member of the All District select. Joining Lonestar SC, he was a member of the academy and played for them at under-17/18 level, winning the Disney Showcase Championship with them in 2010.

Joining Oregon State University, he worked his way immediately into their soccer program, starting the first six games of the season before an injury took him off the active roster for the rest of the season. In his second year, he received a Pac-12 Honorable Mention for his fifteen appearances, scoring in his first three appearances and finishing the season as the joint second highest scorer for the team. His third year saw him make ten appearances and equal his four goals from the season before.

New York City FC
On January 15, 2015, Shelton was selected 2nd overall by New York City FC in the 2015 MLS SuperDraft, with the expansion club turning down an offer of a considerable amount of allocation money in exchange for their pick to instead draft the player who Head Coach Jason Kreis described as "our top guy".

He made his debut for the club coming in their first Major League Soccer match, away to fellow expansion team Orlando City SC at the Citrus Bowl; he came on as a 62nd-minute substitute for Mehdi Ballouchy in an eventual 1–1 draw. Shelton totalled 17 games in his first season as his team missed out on the MLS Cup Playoffs, and scored one goal: on May 15 at Yankee Stadium against the Chicago Fire, he replaced Patrick Mullins after 60 minutes, and in added time he equalized for a 2–2 draw from David Villa's pass.

Sporting Kansas City
On December 14, 2017, Shelton was traded to Sporting Kansas City in exchange for Saad Abdul-Salaam.

SC Paderborn
On January 5, 2019, Shelton signed a contract through 30 June 2021 with 2. Bundesliga side SC Paderborn 07.

Return to Sporting Kansas City
On December 9, 2019, it was announced that Shelton would return to Sporting Kansas City on a contract through to 2022 with an option for 2023.

International career
Shelton was called up to the United States under-18 team in 2010, attending a training camp with them in California before flying out to Israel in December 2010 to compete in an international tournament against the hosts plus France and Germany. He played in all three games, but failed to score in any.

Some five years later, his drafting by New York City FC led to Shelton receiving a call-up to the United States under-23 in their games against Bosnia and Herzegovina and Denmark in March 2015. Shelton was brought on from the substitutes bench after 61 minutes against Bosnia and played the full match against Denmark, though again he failed to score on either occasion.

In January 2016, Shelton received his first call up to the senior United States squad for friendlies against Iceland and Canada.

Career statistics

Club

References

External links

 
 Oregon State University bio
 Soccerway profile

1993 births
Living people
African-American soccer players
American soccer players
Association football forwards
Austin Aztex players
Lane United FC players
Major League Soccer players
New York City FC draft picks
New York City FC players
Oregon State Beavers men's soccer players
People from El Paso County, Colorado
Soccer players from Colorado
Soccer players from Texas
Sporting Kansas City players
Sporting Kansas City II players
United States men's under-23 international soccer players
United States men's youth international soccer players
USL Championship players
USL League Two players
SC Paderborn 07 players
2. Bundesliga players
American expatriate soccer players
American expatriate soccer players in Germany
Bundesliga players
21st-century African-American sportspeople